Glengoffe Donovan Johnson (born 2 January 1969) is a Jamaican former professional boxer who competed from 1993 to 2015. He held the IBF, IBO and Ring magazine light heavyweight titles between 2004 and 2005, and challenged once each for world titles at middleweight and super middleweight.

He was named Fighter of the Year in 2004 by The Ring and the Boxing Writers Association of America for his upset knockout victory over Roy Jones Jr. Throughout his career, Johnson was well known for his exceptionally durable chin and relentless pressure fighting style.

Amateur career

Johnson arrived in South Florida from Jamaica at the age of 15. He would not begin boxing as an amateur until a few years later.
Glen "The Road Warrior" Johnson was a late bloomer of the sport, starting at 20 years old in Miami, Florida, at an emerging police boxing gym. Johnson compiled an amateur record of 35-5 and was a two-time Florida State Golden Gloves Champion, once at 165 and at the other at 178-pounds.

Professional career
Johnson won his first 32 professional fights before challenging Bernard Hopkins for the IBF middleweight title in 1997. Johnson was stopped on his feet in the 11th round. He added eight more to his tally of losses, many of them debatable decisions where Johnson was adjudged to have lost to the hometown fighter. He journeyed to England and suffered a controversial draw against Clinton Woods, but defeated him in a rematch by unanimous decision to win the IBF light heavyweight title.

Johnson vs. Jones Jr.

His next fight came against former undisputed light heavyweight champion Roy Jones Jr., who entered following an upset loss to Antonio Tarver earlier that year. In another upset, Johnson knocked Jones out in the ninth round of their September 2004 fight.

Johnson vs. Tarver, Woods III, Griffin
The subsequent split decision victory over Antonio Tarver that December made him IBO and The Ring light heavyweight boxing champion. He was chosen the 2004 fighter of the year by the Boxing Writer's Association of America. Johnson lost the light heavyweight title to Antonio Tarver in the rematch. He then challenged old foe Woods once again for the IBF title. This time Woods beat him by a split decision. He then came back and defeated former champion Montell Griffin in May 2007.

Johnson vs. Dawson, Cloud
Johnson lost a unanimous decision to Chad Dawson on April 12, 2008, for the WBC light heavyweight title. On November 7, 2009, Johnson lost a rematch with Dawson via unanimous decision  in Hartford, Connecticut. The judges scores were 115-113, 115-113 and 117-111 for Dawson.

On August 7, 2010, Johnson challenged Tavoris Cloud for the IBF light heavyweight title but lost a close decision 116-112 from all 3 judges despite landing more punches according to CompuBox.

Super Six World Boxing Classic

Glen Johnson joined the Super Six World Boxing Classic replacing Mikkel Kessler due to Kessler eye injury. Glen Johnson defeated Allan Green by a knockout in the eighth round, on November 6, 2010, in Las Vegas, Nevada and with that win proceeded to the Semi-Final of the Super 6 Tournament where he faced Carl Froch for a place in the Super 6 Final and WBC world super-middleweight title. Johnson Lost the fight by majority decision with one judge scoring the contest a draw and the remaining two judges scoring in favour of Froch.

Professional boxing record

References

External links

Glen Johnson article  at New Times Broward-Palm Beach

Middleweight boxers
1969 births
Living people
International Boxing Federation champions
People from Clarendon Parish, Jamaica
Jamaican male boxers
Super-middleweight boxers
Cruiserweight boxers
International Boxing Organization champions
The Ring (magazine) champions
World light-heavyweight boxing champions
20th-century Jamaican people
21st-century Jamaican people